Benjamin Bargwanna (born 10 April 2001 in Warragul) is a racing driver from Australia. He is the son of Bathurst 1000 winner Jason Bargwanna and grandson to Australian Production Car Champion Harry Bargwanna.

Junior Career 
Ben Bargwanna started in karts as a child before moving into various Hyundai Excel series in 2016. In 2017 he finished third in the Hyundai Excel Nations and in 2018 won the Victorian Series. 

In 2019 he moved to Formula Ford driving a Spectrum to second in the Victorian Formula Ford Championship. In 2020, he again raced in the Victorian Formula Ford Championship and was leading the point score when the season was cancelled due to COVID-19 restrictions.

TCR Australia 
In 2021, he joined his father Jason Bargwanna in the TCR Australia Touring Car Series driving a Peugeot 308. That year he took the 'Rookie of the Year' award  and finished tenth in the standings. 2022 he again raced a Peugeot 308, again finishing tenth and winning his first race at Sandown Raceway.

S5000 
Bargwanna had his first taste of the S5000 at the first round of the 2021 S5000 Tasman Series running in the top ten. His next race was at the Australian Grand Prix support round in the 2022 S5000 Australian Drivers' Championship again running in the top ten. His first full season was in the 2022 S5000 Tasman Series where he finished on the podium in race two and ended up fifth in the championship.

Career results

TCR Australia results

Complete S5000 results

Complete Bathurst 6 Hour results

References

External links

Third Turn profile
News articles, pictures & videos on Motorsport.com
News Articles on Speedcafe.com

2001 births
Living people
Tasman Series drivers
Garry Rogers Motorsport drivers
Formula Ford drivers
Sportsmen from Victoria (Australia)
21st-century Australian people